is a passenger railway station in the city of Hitachiōmiya, Ibaraki, Japan operated by East Japan Railway Company (JR East).

Lines
Shimo-Ogawa Station is served by the Suigun Line, and is located 40.7 kilometers from the official starting point of the line at Mito Station.

Station layout
The station consists of two opposed side platforms connected to the station building by a level crossing. The station is unattended.

Platforms

History
Shimo-Ogawa Station opened on August 15, 1925. The station was absorbed into the JR East network upon the privatization of the Japanese National Railways (JNR) on April 1, 1987. A new station building was completed in 2004.

Surrounding area

 Kuji River

See also
 List of railway stations in Japan

External links

 JR East Station information 

Stations of East Japan Railway Company
Railway stations in Ibaraki Prefecture
Suigun Line
Railway stations in Japan opened in 1925
Hitachiōmiya, Ibaraki